Albert Edward Lambert FRIBA (27 May 1869 – 5 November 1929) was an architect based in Nottingham, England.

Family

He was born in Manton in Rutland on 27 May 1869. He was the son of John Lambert and Louisa. By 1871 the family had moved to Draycott in Derbyshire and in 1881 the family were living at the Grocers Shop & Cottage, Wetheral, Cumberland, England.

In the 1891 census, he was living at 7 Wilfred Street in Derby, with his mother Louisa, and brother George. Albert's profession is given as Architect's assistant.

In 1895 he was living at 6 Norfolk Street, Derby. He married Annie Elizabeth Robinson, daughter of Michael H Robinson (butcher and farmer) and Ann, at the end of 1897.

In 1901 he was living at 8 Douglas Road, Nottingham  and he subsequently lived on Richmond Drive and then Woodland Drive in Mapperley Park in Nottingham. His daughter Jessie Kathleen was born on 18 April 1901.

In 1911, he was living at Hillcrest, Warwick Road, Nottingham, (1911 UK Census) and then moved to 205 Derby Road, Nottingham shortly before his death.
He died at home on 5 November 1929 of Encephalitis Lethargica, diagnosed 5 years earlier.

Career
By 1901 and until at least 1926 he had offices first at 22 and later at 28 Park Row, Nottingham.

He was a Member of the Society of Architects in 1911, Fellow in 1924 and Fellow of the Royal Institute of British Architects in 1925.

Buildings

Victoria Station, Nottingham. 1900. Demolished 1966.
Wesleyan Church, St. Anns Well Road, Nottingham. 1902–03. Largely destroyed by fire on the evening of 8 May 1941 following a bombing raid on Nottingham. Demolished circa 1955. (Rebuilt as King's Hall Methodist Church)
Mapperley Methodist Church, Woodborough Road, Nottingham NG3 5GG 1903–1904.
Nottingham Midland Station Carrington Street, Nottingham 1904.
Heckington Methodist Church 1904-1905
Heckington School
Offices, 14-16 George Street, Nottingham. 1904.
Castle Donington Methodist Church, 1906.
Eaton Methodist Church,  Leicestershire,  1906.
Albert Hall, Nottingham 1907.
Worksop Flour Mill, 1907
Metheringham Methodist Church 1907
Swineshead Methodist Church 1907. Now demolished.
Burton Joyce Methodist Church, 1908.
Catterns House, Princess Street, Long Eaton, Derbyshire. (a private house built in the Arts and Crafts style 1908.)
196 Tamworth Road, Long Eaton, Derbyshire. Private house 1908 (Originally a doctor's surgery.)
Dallow Road Wesleyan Methodist Church,  Luton. 1908.
Thornton in the Dale Methodist Church,  Yorkshire. 1909.
Crumpsall Methodist Church, Oak Road, Collyhurst, Manchester. 1909.
Sleaford, Northgate Methodist Church, 1909 (alterations - building demolished in 1972)
Welbeck Dining Rooms, West Bridgford, Nottingham. 1909.
St John's Methodist Church, Swinton, Near Mexborough. Opened Jun 10th 1910
Albert Hall Institute  Nottingham 1910. Demolished 1987.
Aspinal Centenary (Wesleyan Methodist) Chapel, Reddish Lane, Gorton, Manchester. 1910. Demolished 1972.
Winchmore Hill Methodist Church, Green Lanes, Enfield, London. 1912
Mickleover Wesleyan Methodist Church, Station Road, Mickleover, Derbyshire 1914 (replaced in 2000)
Sedbergh Methodist Church, 1914.
Lenton Methodist Church 1914.
Soapworks Nottingham
Park Lane Wesleyan Methodist Church, Wembley, 1924. Demolished 1961.

References

People from Rutland
1929 deaths
1869 births
Architects from Nottingham
Fellows of the Royal Institute of British Architects